Julien Candelon (born July 8, 1980 in Agen) is a professional rugby union winger currently playing for USA Perpignan in the Top 14.

Candelon has earned two caps for the France national team, the first one coming on 18 June 2005 against South Africa. He has scored two tries for his country. He also played for the France Sevens national team.

References

External links
 
 
 
 
 

Sportspeople from Agen
1980 births
Living people
French rugby union players
France international rugby union players
USA Perpignan players
Rugby sevens players at the 2016 Summer Olympics
Olympic rugby sevens players of France
France international rugby sevens players

fr:Christophe Laussucq